The George D. Birkhoff House is a historic house located at 22 Craigie Street, Cambridge, Massachusetts. It was designated a National Historic Landmark in 1975 for its association with Harvard University Professor George David Birkhoff (1881–1944), one of the most important mathematicians of his time.

The house is a three-story Second Empire wood-frame structure with a mansard roof. Its date of construction is not known, but is surmised to be sometime before the 1890s. The house is not architecturally distinguished, but its exterior has not been significantly altered since its construction. The interior, which follows a center hall plan, has had modernizing alterations, including conversion of the front parlor to have a cathedral ceiling, and the addition of modern plumbing facilities.

George David Birkhoff was born in Michigan and educated at the University of Chicago and Harvard in mathematics. In 1912 he accepted a teaching position at Harvard, where he remained for the rest of his life. Birkhoff was influential in advancing the field of mathematics, solving Henri Poincaré's "last geometric theorem", and developing what is now called the ergodic theorem, a thesis important in statistical physics and the study of dynamical systems. Virtually every honor available to mathematicians was bestowed on him during his lifetime, and there is a prize named in his honor.

Birkhoff lived in this house for eight years, from 1920 to 1928. It was declared a National Historic Landmark and listed on the National Register of Historic Places in 1975.

See also
 List of National Historic Landmarks in Massachusetts
 National Register of Historic Places listings in Cambridge, Massachusetts

References

Houses on the National Register of Historic Places in Cambridge, Massachusetts
National Historic Landmarks in Massachusetts